Borgo d'Anaunia is a comune (municipality) in the Province of Trentino in the Italian region Trentino-Alto Adige/Südtirol. It was established on 1 January 2020 by the merger of the municipalities of Castelfondo, Fondo and Malosco.

References

Cities and towns in Trentino-Alto Adige/Südtirol